Gunnar Fredrik Höjer (27 January 1875 – 13 March 1936) was a Swedish gymnast  who competed in the 1908 Summer Olympics. He was part of the Swedish team that won the all-around gold medal. Aged 33, he was the oldest member of the team.

References

1875 births
1936 deaths
Swedish male artistic gymnasts
Gymnasts at the 1908 Summer Olympics
Olympic gymnasts of Sweden
Olympic gold medalists for Sweden
Olympic medalists in gymnastics
Medalists at the 1908 Summer Olympics
Sportspeople from Norrköping